Vijayendra Kasturi Ranga Varadaraja Rao (8 July 1908 – 25 July 1991) was an Indian economist, politician and educator.

Early life
Rao was born in a Kannada speaking Madhwa Brahmin family on 8 July 1908 at Kancheepuram in Tamil Nadu to Kasturirangachar and Bharati Amma. He had his early schooling in Tindivanam and Madras (Chennai). He was a recipient of the Padma Vibhushan. He served as a Union Minister for the Education in 1971, elected as member for Bellary in 1967 and 1971. He obtained a B.A and M.A in economics from Bombay University before earning another B.A from Cambridge where he was a member of Gonville & Caius College. He was awarded the Ph.D. of Cambridge in 1937; the title of his doctoral thesis was "The national income of British India, 1931-1932". He studied with John Maynard Keynes.

Honours

Rao received many awards that include: Cobdon Club Medal in Political Economy (1927), Lord Minto Scholarship (1927–29), Dakshina Fellowship (1927–29), Madan Memorial Lecture in Indian Currency, Bombay (1931), Sir Mangaldas Nathubhai Traveling Fellowship, Bombay University (1932–35), Carton Studentship in Social Sciences, Great Britain (1934–36), Sir Thomas Greshan Research Studentship, Caius College, Cambridge (1934–36) Adam Smith Prize, Cambridge and Dadabhai Nauroji Memorial Prize (1934). Academic Honours include Honorary D.Litt. from Delhi, Jabalpore, Indore, Andhra and Nagpur Universities, Hon D.C.L. from Oxford University, Honorary Professorship of Osmania, Andhra Universities, Hon. Fellowship of Conville and Caius College, Cambridge.

Institute builder

Rao established three noted institutions in Social Science research in India: Delhi School of Economics, Institute of Economic Growth and the Institute for Social and Economic Change. He was also instrumental in establishing the Indian Council of Social Science Research, Agro-economic Centres and Population Research Centres. He created an autonomous public body in the form of the Indian Council of Social Science Research. This was established under the Societies Registration Act (1860) on 30 July 1969 at Delhi. All the 3 institutions founded by him, even today maintain very close intra-institutional relationship. Central Institute of Indian Languages, Mysuru, an office of the Ministry of Human Resource Development, is also considered to be the brainchild of Rao. Another organization that owes its present prominence to Rao’s vision is the Indian Institute of Foreign Trade, Delhi. He was one of the founding members of the Delhi Karnataka Sangha and served as its third president.

Publications
Notable among his  works are: Taxation of Income in India  (1931), An essay on India’s National Income -1925-29 – (1936); The National Income of British India (1940); India and International Currency Plans (1945); Post-War Rupee (1948); Gandhian Alternative to Western Socialism (1970); Values and Economic Development – The Indian Challenge (1971); the Nehru Legacy (1971); Swami Vivekananda – Prophet of Vedantic Socialism (1978); Many Languages and One Nation – the Problem of Integration (1979); India’s National Income  1950-80 (1983) Food, Nutrition and Poverty (1982); Indian socialism: Retrospect and Prospect (1982), etc. He was awarded Padma Vibhushan  by the Government of India in 1974.

Positions held

 Adviser for Planning, Food Department (1945–46)
 Food and Economic Adviser, Government of India at Washington (1946–47)
 Director, Delhi School of Economics, Delhi (1948–57)
 Vice Chancellor, University of Delhi (1957–60)
 Director, Institute of Economic Growth, Delhi (1960–63)
 Member, Planning Commission (1963–66)
 Union Cabinet Minister for Transport and Shipping (1967–69)
 Union Cabinet Minister for Education & Youth Services (1969–71)
 Director, Institute for Social and Economic Change, Bangalore (1972–77)
 National Professor, Government of India (1985-1990).

Memberships/associations
He was member of several Commissions and Committees, prominent among which being Member-Secretary, Bombay Economic Industrial Survey Committee; Chairman, U.N Sub-Commission for Economic Development (which led to the establishment of the soft loan window of the World Bank, the IDA; Member, Taxation Enquiry Commission, Member, National Income Committee; Member, Planning Advisory Board, Government of India; Chairman, U.N Sub-Committee on Experts on Levels of Living; etc.

Manmohan Singh, India's Prime Minister has credited him with being responsible for the high quality of economics education and research in India, by being the founder-director of the Delhi School of Economics, the Institute of Economic Growth, Delhi and the Institute for Social and Economic Change, Bangalore. In the international sphere he was one of the central forces behind the institution of the United Nations Development Program (UNDP) and the IDA. He is commemorated by the VKRV Rao prizes in Social Science Research.

References

Further reading
 S. L. Rao (ed.) The Partial Memoirs of V.K.R.V. Rao Oxford University Press: USA, 2002  reviewed in Tale of triumph — or disillusionment?, The Hindu, 20 January 2002 accessed at  30 August 2006
 Rao, Jayaram,Rao, Nadkarni and Deshpande (ed)"A Passionate Humanitarian", Academic Foundation, New Delhi 2008.

1908 births
1991 deaths
Recipients of the Padma Vibhushan in civil service
People from Bellary district
Kannada people
India MPs 1967–1970
India MPs 1971–1977
Lok Sabha members from Karnataka
Members of the Planning Commission of India
Education Ministers of India
20th-century Indian economists
Madhva Brahmins